A pneumatic cannon is typically a large-calibre projectile launcher that uses compressed air as a propellant. Other related terms are pneumatic weapon and air gun. It may refer to:

 Potato cannon, an improvised launcher, typically made from lengths of pipe, used to project potatoes, which sometimes use compressed air as a propellant
 Dynamite gun, a cannon which uses compressed air to launch explosive shells filled with dynamite, rather than a more conventional explosive propellant
 Holman Projector, a mortar-like pneumatic or steam-operated air-defense weapon used by the Royal Navy during World War II
 FN 303, a compressed-air powered less-lethal projectile launcher designed for crowd control

Other uses
 The M61 Vulcan, M134 Minigun, or other Gatling-type weapons, which do not propel projectiles by compressed air, but instead sometimes have their operating mechanism powered by bleed air when mounted in certain turbine-powered aircraft; they are typically hydraulically or electrically operated in other applications, without a ready supply of compressed air. This is a rare usage of this term.